Alexandre Ferreira (born 25 January 1979 in Rio de Janeiro, Brazil) is a retired professional mixed martial artist. A professional from 1998 until 2010, he fought in the UFC, Jungle Fight, RINGS, and the IFL.

Mixed martial arts career

Ultimate Fighting Championship
Ferreira made his promotional debut against Vladimir Matyushenko on November 13, 2010 at UFC 122, losing via first round TKO.

Ferreira was expected to face Rousimar Palhares on March 3, 2011 at UFC Live: Sanchez vs. Kampmann.  However, on January 18, Ferreira was dismissed from Chute Boxe, his home training camp, for a "lack of commitment." Less than an hour later, it was reported that the fight had been cancelled due to Ferreira losing family and friends in the Brazilian floods, resulting in him being in "no condition to train or fight." Palhares faced David Branch.

Ferreira/Palhares was expected to take place on August 27, 2011 at UFC 134.  However, Ferreira was released from the organization and replaced by Dan Miller.

Mixed martial arts record

|-
| Loss
| align=center| 18–6
| Vladimir Matyushenko
| TKO (punches and elbows)
| UFC 122
| 
| align=center| 1
| align=center| 2:20
| Oberhausen, Germany
| 
|-
| Win
| align=center| 18–5
| Walter Mazurkievicz
| Submission (kimura)
| Jungle Fight 15
| 
| align=center| 1
| align=center| 1:10
| Rio de Janeiro, Brazil
| 
|-
| Win
| align=center| 17–5
| Vagner Curio
| Submission (achilles lock)
| Jungle Fight 14: Ceará
| 
| align=center| 1
| align=center| 0:16
| São Paulo, Brazil
|Light Heavyweight debut.
|-
| Win
| align=center| 16–5
| Lew Polley
| Submission (guillotine choke)
| IFL: Las Vegas
| 
| align=center| 1
| align=center| 0:20
| Las Vegas, Nevada,  United States
| 
|-
| Win
| align=center| 15–5
| Fábio Maldonado
| Submission (kneebar)
| MTL: Final
| 
| align=center| 1
| align=center| 0:27
| Belém, Brazil
| 
|-
| Win
| align=center| 14–5
| Rafael Monteiro
| Submission (kimura)
| Mo Team League 1
| 
| align=center| 1
| align=center| 1:20
| Belém, Brazil
|
|-
| Win
| align=center| 13–5
| Branden Lee Hinkle
| Submission (heel hook)
| GFC: Evolution
| 
| align=center| 1
| align=center| 0:37
| Columbus, Ohio, United States
| 
|-
| Win
| align=center| 12–5
| Rodrigo Gripp de Sousa
| Submission (rear-naked choke)
| Floripa Fight 4
| 
| align=center| 1
| align=center| 4:50
| Natal, Brazil
| 
|-
| Loss
| align=center| 11–5
| Felipe Arinelli
| Decision (unanimous)
| Super Challenge 1
| 
| align=center| 2
| align=center| 5:00
| São Paulo, Brazil
| 
|-
| Win
| align=center| 11–4
| Michael Knaap
| Submission (armbar)
| WCFC: No Guts No Glory
| 
| align=center| 1
| align=center| 3:11
| Manchester, England
| 
|-
| Win
| align=center| 10–4
| Julio Cesar Jamanta
| Submission (guillotine choke)
| Jungle Fight 5
| 
| align=center| 1
| align=center| 0:52
| Manaus, Brazil
| 
|-
| Win
| align=center| 9–4
| Jose Freitas
| Submission (americana)
| Fight for Respect 1
| 
| align=center| 1
| align=center| N/A
| Lisbon, Portugal
| 
|-
| Loss
| align=center| 8–4
| Chris Monson
| TKO (exhaustion)
| HOOKnSHOOT: Kings 1
| 
| align=center| 2
| align=center| 3:00
| Evansville, Indiana, United States
| 
|-
| Loss
| align=center| 8–3
| Chris Haseman
| Submission (guillotine choke)
| RINGS: World Title Series 2
| 
| align=center| 1
| align=center| 3:03
| Rotterdam, Netherlands
| 
|-
| Loss
| align=center| 8–2
| Hiromitsu Kanehara
| Submission (kimura)
| RINGS: King of Kings 2000 Block B
| 
| align=center| 2
| align=center| 2:45
| Osaka, Japan
| 
|-
| Win
| align=center| 8–1
| Kevin Cook
| TKO (submission to punches)
| WEF: New Blood Conflict
| 
| align=center| 1
| align=center| 1:28
| Evansville, Indiana, United States
| 
|-
| Win
| align=center| 7–1
| Moti Horenstein
| Submission (americana)
| 2 Hot 2 Handle 1
| 
| align=center| 1
| align=center| 2:43
| Rotterdam, Netherlands
| 
|-
| Win
| align=center| 6–1
| Shannon Ritch
| Submission (americana)
| Amsterdam Absolute Championship 2
| 
| align=center| 1
| align=center| 0:48
| Amsterdam, Netherlands
| 
|-
| Win
| align=center| 5–1
| Bob Schrijber
| Submission (rear-naked choke)
| World Vale Tudo Championship 9
| 
| align=center| 1
| align=center| 2:11
| Aruba
|WVC 9 Heavyweight Tournament Final.
|-
| Win
| align=center| 4–1
| Jimmy Westfall
| Submission (rear-naked choke)
| World Vale Tudo Championship 9
| 
| align=center| 1
| align=center| 0:56
| Aruba
|WVC 9 Heavyweight Tournament Semifinal.
|-
| Win
| align=center| 3–1
| Heath Herring
| Decision (split)
| World Vale Tudo Championship 8
| 
| align=center| 1
| align=center| 30:00
| Aruba
|WVC 8 Heavyweight Tournament Final.
|-
| Win
| align=center| 2–1
| Rodney Glunder
| TKO (submission to punches)
| World Vale Tudo Championship 8
| 
| align=center| 1
| align=center| 1:59
| Aruba
|WVC 8 Heavyweight Tournament Semifinal.
|-
| Win
| align=center| 1–1
| Astravroslakis Astravroslakis
| TKO (submission to punches)
| World Vale Tudo Championship 8
| 
| align=center| 1
| align=center| 1:00
| Aruba
|WVC 8 Heavyweight Tournament Quarterfinal.
|-
| Loss
| align=center| 0–1
| Tim Catalfo
| DQ (eye gouge)
| IVC 4: The Battle
| 
| align=center| 1
| align=center| 9:19
| Manaus, Brazil
|

Submission grappling record
KO PUNCHES
|- style="text-align:center; background:#f0f0f0;"
| style="border-style:none none solid solid; "|Result
| style="border-style:none none solid solid; "|Opponent
| style="border-style:none none solid solid; "|Method
| style="border-style:none none solid solid; "|Event
| style="border-style:none none solid solid; "|Date
| style="border-style:none none solid solid; "|Round
| style="border-style:none none solid solid; "|Time
| style="border-style:none none solid solid; "|Notes
|-
|Loss|| Andre Galvao || || ADCC 2007 Absolute|| 2007|| 1|| ||
|-
|Loss|| Marcelo García || || ADCC 2007 Absolute|| 2007|| 1|| ||
|-
|Win|| Tarsis Humphreys || || ADCC 2007 Absolute|| 2007|| 1|| ||
|-
|Win|| Jannie Pietilainen || || ADCC 2007 Absolute|| 2007|| 1|| ||
|-
|Loss|| Braulio Estima || || ADCC 2007 –77 kg|| 2007|| 1|| ||
|-
|Win|| Radek Turek || || ADCC 2007 –77 kg|| 2007|| 1|| ||
|-
|Win|| Carl Bierman || || ADCC 2007 –77 kg|| 2007|| 1|| ||
|-
|Loss|| Ronaldo Souza || || ADCC 2005 Absolute|| 2005|| 1|| ||
|-
|Win|| Leo Santos || || ADCC 2005 Absolute|| 2005|| 1|| ||
|-
|Loss|| Roger Gracie || || ADCC 2005 –99 kg|| 2005|| 1|| ||
|-
|Win|| John Olav Einemo || || ADCC 2005 –99 kg|| 2005|| 1|| ||
|-
|Win|| Robert Drysdale || || ADCC 2005 –99 kg|| 2005|| 1|| ||
|-
|Win|| Yukiya Naito || || ADCC 2005 –99 kg|| 2005|| 1|| ||
|-
|Loss|| Dean Lister || || ADCC 2003 Absolute|| 2003|| 1|| ||
|-
|Win|| Fabricio Werdum || || ADCC 2003 Absolute|| 2003|| 1|| ||
|-
|Win|| Andy Reese || || ADCC 2003 Absolute|| 2003|| 1|| ||
|-
|Win|| Rodrigo Medeiros || || ADCC 2003 Absolute|| 2003|| 1|| ||
|-
|Loss|| John Olav Einemo || || ADCC 2003 –99 kg|| 2003|| 1|| ||
|-
|Win|| Xande Ribeiro || || ADCC 2003 –99 kg|| 2003|| 1|| ||
|-
|Win|| Chael Sonnen || || ADCC 2003 –99 kg|| 2003|| 1|| ||
|-
|Win|| Anthony Perush || || ADCC 2003 –99 kg|| 2003|| 1|| ||
|-
|Loss|| Ricco Rodriguez || || ADCC 2001 Absolute|| 2001|| 1|| ||
|-
|Win|| John Olav Einemo || || ADCC 2001 –88 kg|| 2001|| 1|| ||
|-
|Win|| Chael Sonnen || || ADCC 2001 –88 kg|| 2001|| 1|| || Guillotine Choke
|-
|Win|| Marc Laimon || || ADCC 2001 –88 kg|| 2001|| 1|| ||
|-

References

External links
 
 
 
 

1979 births
Living people
Brazilian male mixed martial artists
Light heavyweight mixed martial artists
Mixed martial artists utilizing catch wrestling
Mixed martial artists utilizing Luta Livre
Mixed martial artists utilizing Brazilian jiu-jitsu
Sportspeople from Rio de Janeiro (city)
Brazilian practitioners of Brazilian jiu-jitsu
People awarded a black belt in Brazilian jiu-jitsu
Brazilian catch wrestlers
Ultimate Fighting Championship male fighters